Kalateh-ye Hajji Azim (also Romanized as Kalāteh-ye Ḩājjī ‘Az̧īm) is a village in Balaband Rural District, in the Central District of Fariman County, Razavi Khorasan Province, Iran. At the 2006 census, its population was 21, in 5 families.

References 

Populated places in Fariman County